TRT International April 23 Children's Festival is celebrated on April 23 each year in Turkey. This festival is gathering the children from all over the world under the motto of "Love, Friendship and Peace". The festival is organized by Turkish Radio and Television Corporation.

History

The 23rd April Children's Festival was dedicated to Turkish children by Mustafa Kemal Atatürk, founder of the Republic of Turkey, to mark the opening of the Assembly. 

The festival has been celebrated internationally since 1979. The Children's Festival was first celebrated in Turkey on 23 April 1920, when the Turkish Grand National Assembly was opened. The Festival intends to contribute creation of a world where children can live peacefully by developing sentiments of fraternity, love and friendship.

The greatest aspiration of Atatürk, who saved his country from occupations and introduced reforms in all fields hence changing the viewpoint of the nation it was modernization, in other words, an industrialized country that the industry of the Republic which it was founded on was out of date and poorly equipped, Atatürk endeavored to achieve modernization through educational reform, and thus entrusted Turkey to the children and the youth.  Atatürk knew that modernization could not be achieved in a rapid way; therefore, he presumed that the Turkish children educated at schools resting upon positive sciences could attain his goals. He believed his nation and lived for what he believed. This is the main philosophy of the 23rd April.  As can be seen, the educated children and youth have made great contributions to the creation of modern Turkey.  Present-day Turkey has evolved over the years and has attained a level of a modern state. 

As UNESCO proclaimed 1979 as the International Year of the Child, director of children's programmes of TRT Ankara Television Tekin Özertem and his assistant Canan Arısoy developed a project aimed at embracing all the children in the world. Upon approval of the project by top executives of the TRT Corporation, preparations for the organization commenced. Thus, the first celebration of TRT International 23 April Children's festival took place on 23 April 1979 in Turkey, with participation of five countries, namely the USSR, Iraq, Italy, Romania and Bulgaria. Today, TRT International 23 April Children's festival is celebrated every year with participation of approximately 50 countries. From 1979 to 2000, celebrations were performed in the capital city Ankara. In the following years, celebrations took place in Turkey's various major cities such as İzmir, İstanbul and Antalya. Nane Annan, spouse of the former United Nations Secretary General Kofi Annan, became the honorary guest of the celebrations on 23 April 2000. In her speech at the gala, Mrs Annan expressed her pleasure at participating in the celebrations and passed greetings from her spouse Kofi Annan. Mrs. Annan also called on the entire world to say “Yes” to the aspiration of children. After her speech, “the common declaration of the  children from 40 countries”, which was approved by the children at the International Children's Congress  on 18 April, was read in English and Turkish. The declaration was presented to Mrs. Annan to hand it over to Kofi Annan.

Children aged between 8 and 14 attend the international 23 April children's festival. The program approximately covers a period from 16 to 26 April. The invited groups are made up of nearly 20 children and 6 executive leaders. By 15 April, guests arrive in the city where the celebrations will take place. TRT appoints a guide for each group and the guides enable coordination with group leaders. Through primary schools in the festival city, each group is entertained by families of their Turkish peers in a warm and affectionate environment. In this way, children of the world recount positive traits of the Turkish nation to their own families and friends when they return to home countries. Doubtlessly, this makes Turkish people gratified. Festival Week begins with a Festival Parade. During the parade, guests wear their traditional outfits, perform their traditional music and dance on the largest street of the city. In the following days, guest countries perform outdoor shows in large parks and embrace with Turkish people. Festival week continues with the children's visit to the mausoleum of Atatürk, the great leader who dedicated this festival to Turkish children. Then, the children are welcomed by the president of the Turkish Republic, president of the Turkish National Grand Assembly, and director general of TRT.

On 22 April, the children gather to rehearse the gala. When the big day comes, the gala of the TRT 23 April Children's Festival takes place.  In the gala, which lasts nearly four hours and is broadcast live, all the groups wear their national costumes and present three-minute performances accompanied with their traditional music.

The gala continues with the children conveying the greetings they have brought from their home countries, and ends with a hand-in-hand dance of all the flowers of the world embraced in sentiments of peace and friendship. Through picnics and excursions on 24 and 25 April, the unison and fraternity of the world and Turkish children reach their peak. These activities contribute to the promotion of Turkey and the hospitable Turkish people. When the last day arrives, 26 April, sad hours for children have come. Bursting into tears, they begin to return to their home countries; they are leaving behind their Turkish brothers and sisters, but taking along peace and friendship with them. In a flood of emotions, the festival week comes to an end.

Participant countries

See also
Children's day
Turkish Radio and Television Corporation

External links
 http://www.trt23nisan.com/en/

Children's festivals
Festivals in Turkey
Turkish children
Spring (season) events in Turkey